Alabaster is an English surname, originally meaning someone who provided armed service with a crossbow. Notable people with the surname include:

 Chaloner Alabaster (1838–1898) British consular officer in China (brother of Henry)
 C. Grenville Alabaster, (1880–1958) Attorney General of Hong Kong
 Gren Alabaster, (born 1933) New Zealand Cricketer (brother of Jack)
 Henry Alabaster (1836–1884) British advisor to King Rama V of Thailand (brother of Chaloner)
 Jack Alabaster (born 1930) New Zealand Cricketer (brother of Gren)
 Martin Alabaster (born 1958) British Royal Navy admiral
 William Alabaster (1567–1640) poet, playwright, and religious writer

References 

English-language surnames